Harry McHugh (born 14 October 2002) is an English footballer who plays as a forward for  club Wigan Athletic.

Early life
McHugh was born in Liverpool.

Career
After a spell with Everton, McHugh joined Wigan Athletic's academy at under-13 level. He signed a two-year scholarship in 2019. McHugh made his debut for Wigan Athletic on 8 November 2020 as a substitute in a 3–2 FA Cup defeat to Chorley, and made his first senior start in their following match, a 2–2 draw with Tranmere Rovers in the EFL Trophy 11 November 2020. He scored his first goal for the club in that match, a 25-yard finish in first-half stoppage time. His first league appearance came as a late substitute in a 0–0 home draw against Bristol Rovers on 24 November 2020.

On 8 September 2022, McHugh signed for National League North club Chester on an initial 28-day loan.

Career statistics

References

External links
 

Living people
2002 births
English footballers
Association football forwards
Wigan Athletic F.C. players
Chester F.C. players
English Football League players